Monomakh's Cap, also called the Golden Cap, is a chief relic of the Muscovite Grand Princes and Russian Tsars. It is a symbol-crown of the Russian autocracy, and is the oldest of the crowns currently exhibited at the Imperial treasury section of the Kremlin Armoury. Monomakh's Cap is an early 14th-century gold filigree skullcap composed of eight sectors, elaborately ornamented with a scrolled gold overlay, inlaid with precious stones (ruby and emerald) and pearls, and trimmed with sable. The cap is surmounted by a simple gold cross with pearls at each of the extremities.

Origin
The main hypothesis is of old-Moscow origin. One of the others is it Central Asian origin (from ethnological or cultural point of view) has led some modern scholars to view the crown as a gift from Uzbeg Khan of the Golden Horde to his brother-in-law, Ivan Kalita of the Grand Duchy of Moscow (Muscovy) during Mongol-Tatar after the Mongol invasion of Kievan Rus'. Boris Uspensky (1996) in particular argues that the Tatar headgear was originally used in coronation ceremonies to signify the Muscovite ruler's subordination to the khan. According to Sergey Solovyov (1879) "after the death of Ivan Kalita all Russian princes traveled to the Horde... and the Khan announced the eldest son of Kalita, Simeon, the Grand Prince of Vladimir".

After Muscovy overcame the period of feudal fragmentation, and Ivan III of Moscow and Vladimir asserted his position as successor to the Roman emperors, there arose a legend that the cap had been presented by the Byzantine emperor Constantine IX Monomachus to his grandson Vladimir Monomakh, the founder of the city of Vladimir and patrilineal ancestor of Ivan III. The legend was elaborated in The Tale of the Princes of Vladimir and served as one of the grounds for the "Moscow as the Third Rome" political theory. Accordingly, the crown became known as "Monomakh's Cap", the term first recorded in a Muscovite document from 1518. However the fact  that Constantine IX Monomachus died 50 years before the coronation of Vladimir Monomakh makes the statement really a legend. The first version of the orient origin of the Cap (Uzbeg Khan) was suggested by George Vernadsky. Vernadsky was pointing to an interesting fact that according to Paul Pelliot Özbäg can be interpreted as a freeman (maître de sa personne).

Professor Kramarovsky who was specifically interested in the origin of the cap remarks that according to the technology of the headwear production the origin of the cap is either out of the Volga cities or Crimea where the school of Golden Horde filigree had developed. According to Aleksandr Andreevich Spitsyn possibly the cap was initially topped with the similar cross of the Jani Beg crown, however the German ambassador of the Holy Roman Emperor Maximilian I, Sigismund von Herberstein (notorious for his Notes on Muscovite Affairs) does not support that fact. 

After Ivan the Terrible had himself crowned the first Russian Tsar with this headgear, the Polish king asked him to explain the meaning of his new title. To that Ivan replied that whoever is crowned with Monomakh's Cap is traditionally called a tsar, because it was a gift from a tsar (i.e., Constantine IX) who had sent the Metropolitan of Ephesus to Kiev to crown Vladimir Monomakh with this cap. Ivan was presumably not aware that at the time of Constantine IX Monomachus' death, Vladimir Monomakh was only two years old and he was not the Kievan sovereign yet.

The Monomakh Cap was last used in the dual coronation of Ivan V and Peter the Great in 1682, though it was carried in the coronation procession thereafter. When Peter assumed the title of emperor, a new western-style crown was fashioned, but was not used in a coronation until that of Catherine I.

See also
 Caps of the Russian tsardom (:ru:Шапки Русского царства)
 Jericho's caps of Russian tsars (:ru:Шапки ерихонские русских царей) – royal parade helms
 Russian Imperial Crown
 Muscovy Crown
 Holy Crown of Hungary

References

External links
 Macro Photography The Crown of Monomakh
 Crown of Monomakh pictures and description
 The Crown of Monomakh at kreml.ru
 Tatar's hats – Crowns of the Ruthenian Tsars, based on the article "Crowns of Ruthenian Tsars – landmarks of Tatar Culture". magazine "Idel" #3/4, 1996.

Tsardom of Russia
Individual crowns
Russian clothing
Russian monarchy
Tourist attractions in Moscow
National symbols of Russia
Medieval crowns
Regalia of Russia
Grand Duchy of Moscow